The 1884 United States presidential election in Colorado took place on November 4, 1884, as part of the 1884 United States presidential election. Voters chose three representatives, or electors to the Electoral College, who voted for president and vice president.

Colorado voted for the Republican nominee, James G. Blaine, over the Democratic nominee, Grover Cleveland. Blaine won the state by a margin of 12.57 points. In its earliest years as a state Colorado was like the Plains States to its east  solidly Republican, with that party continuously controlling the legislature and holding the governorship for five of seven terms. This was in spite of widespread criticism of the national GOP for its monetary policy in a state that was the major producer of silver in the United States

Results

Results by county

References

Colorado
1884
1884 Colorado elections